Beauty World, also known as Tang Gong Meiren Tianxia and World of a Beauty, is a Chinese fantasy-supernatural television series set in the Tang dynasty. It was directed by Lee Wai-chu, produced and written by Yu Zheng, and starred Zhang Ting, Ming Dow, Li Xiaolu, Mickey He, Zheng Guolin, Yang Mi and Tong Liya in the leading roles. The series is regarded as a counterpart to Beauty's Rival in Palace, a similar 2010 television series set in the Han Dynasty. It was first aired on 21 October 2011 on Guangzhou Zonghe Channel in mainland China.

Plot
There is mystery during the reign of Emperor Gaozong of Tang. Empress Wang is accused of murdering the infant Princess Andingsi, the daughter of the Emperor and Wu Meiniang. There are also several rare incidents in the imperial palace. Helan Xin'er, a detective, and Ming Chongyan, Empress Wang's former lover, decide to investigate the mysteries.

By chance, Helan Xin'er arrives in a brothel. She meets the owner, who reveals herself to be the mother of the Emperor. The brother owner was once Empress Zhangsun's best friend and fell in love with Emperor Taizong of Tang. Empress Zhangsun betrayed her so the brothel owner switched their children at birth. Then who and where is Empress Zhangsun's child?

Another mystery is a lady named Qingluan. She is supposedly a white fox that saved the Emperor several years ago. The Emperor favors her, but Wu Meiniang is actually suspicious. The detectives later find out that she was a spy and the perpetrator of Princess Andingsi's murder is actually the Emperor, who wanted to get rid of Zhangsun Wuji.

Cast
 Zhang Ting as Wu Meiniang
 Ming Dow as Ming Chongyan / Ming Yi
 Li Xiaolu as Helan Xin'er
 Mickey He as Pei Shaoqing
 Zheng Guolin as Li Zhi
 Yang Mi as Qingluan
 Tong Liya as Wu Qingcheng
 Zhou Muyin as Wang Nijun (based on Empress Wang)
 Chang Chen-kuang as Zhangsun Wuji
 Lü Jiarong as Yu Qilin
 Wang Likun as Baihe
 Cao Xiwen as Xiao Wanwan (based on Consort Xiao)
Zhang Meng as Xuanyu
 Guo Zhenni as Zhangsun Wugou (based on Empress Zhangsun)
 He Saifei as Lin Xueyi
 Liu Fang as Hongxiu
 Catherine Hung as Miao Fengniang
 Xiong Naijin as Liruo
 Cheng Yi as Feng Xiaobao (Xue Huaiyi)
 Deng Sha as Zhangsun Pingting
 Gao Yang as Ying Caidie
 Gao Hao as Shangguan Hao
 Miao Luoyi as Caiyu
 Huang Haibing as Li Shimin
 He Yanni as Shangguan Yun'er
 Li Sha as Yang Nüshi
 Ye Simiao as Jin Qiaoyu
 Liu Jiayuan as Yuenu
 Chi Lijing as Fang Lingsu
 Yang Shengwen as Beauty Wang
 Dong Hui as Yuan Chunyu
 Bai Shan as Lu Mingzhu
 Han Zixuan as Li Hong
 Chen Hani as Ai Jinlian
 Luo Jin as Ji Dapeng
 Ma Wenlong as Yuanxiu
 Wei Wei as Ma Rengui
 Deng Xibin as Khan of Western Turks
 He Xianda as Luo Binwang
 Ren Xuehai as Wang Nijun's father
 Jiang Yiyi as Xiaoxin'er
 Su Qing as Wang Yuqian
 Xu Qifeng as Shen Daguo

Broadcasts

External links
  Beauty World on Sina.com

2011 Chinese television series debuts
Television series set in the Tang dynasty
Chinese fantasy television series
Television series set in the Zhou dynasty (690–705)
Television shows written by Yu Zheng
Television series set in the 7th century
Television series by Huanyu Film